The Factory is a 2018 Russian crime thriller film directed and written by Yuri Bykov. It stars Denis Shvedov and Andrey Smolyakov. It screened in the Contemporary World Cinema section at the 2018 Toronto International Film Festival.

Synopsis
The owner of the Kalugin's factory informed the workers that he will be  obliged to close it soon as it is not profitable.  The boss, a local oligarch called Kalugin was kidnapped from his car by masked and armed persons who demanded for him a big ransom. The money is taken to the workers by the head of the oligarch personal security team. His heavily armed mercenaries arrive at night at the factory where the boss is being held hostage.

Those who barricaded themselves in the workshop are local workers led by a former Special Forces soldier, nicknamed Sedoi. Six months without a salary and the impending bankruptcy of the plant push them to a desperate step.

To pull out their boss, nothing will stop the mercenaries. But unlike them, hard workers have nothing more to lose.

Cast
 Denis Shvedov as Sedoi
 Andrey Smolyakov as Konstantin Kalugin
 Vladislav Abashin as Tuman
 Ivan Yankovsky as Vladimir
 Aleksandr Bukharov as Terekhov
 Dmitri Kulichkov as Ryaboi
 Kirill Polukhin as Andreich
Yury Tarasov as  Vesyolyiy 
Aleksey Komashko as Sedmoy
Aleksey Faddeev as Ponomar
 Sergey Sosnovsky as Kazak
 Vladislav Kotlyarsky as prosecutor

Production
The filming began in October 2017.  The shooting took place at a real factory of reinforced concrete structures in the Sokolniki district (Moscow), the work of the plant was not stopped during the shooting.

Reception 
The film received average ratings from film critics.

According to Andrei Konchalovsky, Bykov everything goes into the plot, instead of doing the main thing, the meaning of life.

References

External links 
 
 
 «Прямолинейно»: Иностранная пресса о «Заводе» Быкова

2018 films
2010s Russian-language films
French crime thriller films
Films directed by Yuri Bykov
Films about kidnapping
Fictional factory workers
Films about social issues
Films about labour
Films about labor relations
2018 crime thriller films
Russian crime thriller films
2010s French films